Skara Glen Stables is a thoroughbred race horse breeding farm in Pennsylvania owned by Stanley and Marcia Gumberg and family.  A small farm situated in Greensburg, Pennsylvania, it was named for the Skara islands north of Scotland.

Skara Glen got its start as a thoroughbred racing stable, whose famous progeny include Cinnomon Sugar, Weekend Madness, and Red Roses Story.

However, now boarding their mares at Lane's End Farm, Skara Glen now breeds for sale only, including racing, hunting, and jumping thoroughbreds.

More current famous progeny include Jazil and Rags to Riches, along with the hunter, Corsani, and show jumper, Chinita.

References

External links 
 NTRA Bio
 HorseWeb Peter Phelps
 Cyberhorse Young Horse Finals

American racehorse owners and breeders
Horse farms in the United States
Farms in Pennsylvania
Buildings and structures in Westmoreland County, Pennsylvania